Mellor is a civil parish in Ribble Valley, Lancashire, England.  It contains ten listed buildings that are recorded in the National Heritage List for England.  Of these, one is at Grade II*, the middle grade, and the others are at Grade II, the lowest grade.  The parish contains the village of Mellor, and is otherwise rural.  The only listed building in the village is the church.  The other listed buildings are houses and associated structures, farmhouses, and a bridge.

Key

Buildings

References

Citations

Sources

Lists of listed buildings in Lancashire
Buildings and structures in Ribble Valley